Spyder Turner (born Dwight David Turner, February 4, 1947, Beckley, West Virginia) is an American soul singer. Turner was raised in Detroit, and sang in doo wop groups and high school choirs while young. He first began recording after winning a contest at the Apollo Theater in New York City, recording some solo sides and singing backup for groups called The Stereophonics and The Fabulous Counts.

In 1966, record producer Clay McMurray had Turner's group do a recording session, and soon after Turner signed to MGM Records and released a single, a cover of the soul number "Stand by Me," imitating not only Ben E. King, but Smokey Robinson, Chuck Jackson and Billy Stewart, among others. The tune climbed to No. 3 on the US Billboard R&B Singles chart and No. 12 on the Billboard Hot 100 chart early in 1967. Soon after, a full-length album was released, peaking at No. 14 on the R&B Albums chart and No. 158 on the Billboard 200. A second single from the album, "I Can't Make it Anymore", peaked at No. 95 on the Hot 100 pop chart.

Turner left his management after dissatisfaction with MGM's soul division (which consisted only of Howard Tate and himself), and played regionally in the South in the early 1970s.

Later that decade, Turner began working with Norman Whitfield, and wrote the tune "Do Your Dance" for Rose Royce, which was a top ten R&B hit. He continued recording in the late 1970s and early 1980s, including a song for the movie The Last Dragon (billed on the soundtrack as Dwight David). He did some acting as well. He continues to perform in Michigan, and released his most recent album in 2006 through CD Baby.

In March 2008 Turner appeared on English man Carl Dixon's BandTraxs session at Studio A/Detroit, where he provided vocals and writing skills to complete the songs, along with singers Pree, Gayle Butts and other Detroit musicians including Dennis Coffey (co producer) and Uriel Jones.Turner performed lead and backing on "Tell me (crying over you)","Glory fleeting" and in addition backing vocals on "Suddenly there's you", and as group personnel of 'BandTraxs' singing on the funk/rap styled "Detroit (city by the river)". The session was arranged by ex Motown arranger David J. Van De Pitte.

15% of the cover price of Spyder's single "I'm Gonna Miss You", penned by Frances Nero and released on February 1, 2010, is being donated to the Haiti Recovery Fund.

Discography
Stand By Me (MGM Records, 1967; reissued on CD, 1996)
Music Web (Whitfield Records/Warner Bros. Records, 1978)
Only Love (Whitfield)
Spyder Turner EP (Self-released, 2006)
''Tell me (crying over you) BandTraxs Records released July 1, 2009

References

 An interview with Spyder Turner in 2010 at Soul Express

1947 births
Living people
American soul musicians
Musicians from Michigan
Musicians from West Virginia
People from Beckley, West Virginia